Denise Ouabangui (born 8 June 1968) is a Central African Republic sprinter. She competed in the women's 400 metres at the 1996 Summer Olympics.

References

1968 births
Living people
Athletes (track and field) at the 1996 Summer Olympics
Central African Republic female sprinters
Olympic athletes of the Central African Republic
World Athletics Championships athletes for the Central African Republic
Place of birth missing (living people)
Olympic female sprinters